Thalli Pogathey is a 2021 Indian Tamil-language romantic comedy drama film directed and produced by R. Kannan. It is a remake of 2017 Telugu-language film Ninnu Kori written by Shiva Nirvana. This film stars Atharvaa, Anupama Parameswaran and Amitash Pradhan. The film is produced by R. Kannan himself under the banner Masala Pix, in association with MKRP Productions. Gopi Sunder, who was the composer for original film, composed music for the film also. Selva RK and N Shanmuga Sundaram are the editor and cinematographer, respectively. Raj Kumar murugesan is the art director. The title is inspired by the song of the same name from Achcham Yenbadhu Madamaiyada (2016). The film released on 24 December 2021. The film received mixed reviews from critics with criticism for Anupama's performance, writing, emotional weight and characterization  but with praise for Atharvaa's performance, cinematography, score and production design.

Plot 
On the day of her first wedding anniversary, Pallavi (Anupama Parameswaran), under the pretext of running errands for their party, travels to Los Angeles from her home in San Francisco without the knowledge of her husband Arun (Amitash Pradhan) to meet Karthik (Atharvaa), her former lover.

One and a half years ago in Chennai, Pallavi is a student who wishes to make a recording of a dance performance so that she can show it to her family post marriage. However, a lack of natural talent forbids her from doing so. Karthik, a young statistics student, is an orphan whose godfather Duraisamy (R. S. Shivaji), happens to be the principal of his institution. Karthik wishes to pursue a Ph.D. in his subject and settle in life. Pallavi happens to spot him dancing at a friend's wedding and requests him to teach her. Karthik agrees for the large fee she offers as he is in need of money. He helps her, not only with her dancing but also with other issues, including confronting a bully who torments her. Pallavi wins a dancing competition and the two realize they are in love with each other.

Pallavi tactfully clears the penthouse her family owns so that Karthik can stay in the same house as her. Karthik starts giving tutoring classes in the penthouse and earns the money he requires. When Pallavi's family starts looking for marriage alliances, she requests Karthik to elope with her, and he reluctantly agrees. However, a chance encounter with Pallavi's father, (Aadukalam Naren), makes Karthik realize that he is ineligible to marry her as he hasn't fully settled in life. Taking this to heart, he requests Pallavi to allow him to go to New Delhi and get a Ph.D., thereby securing a future for both of them. Pallavi allows him tearfully, and he leaves for Delhi. For the next few months, she continuously ignores Karthik, who keeps trying to contact her. She is soon approached for marriage by Arun's family, and her family agrees. When Pallavi contacts Karthik, she realizes that she is not ready to take the guilt if he blames her later on for the failure in his career, and unwillingly marries Arun. A year later, Pallavi is contacted by Prof. Duraisamy, who informs her that Karthik has gone into depression and is now an alcoholic. He is on the verge of being fired by his firm in Los Angeles and is spiraling toward a self-destructive path. Feeling responsible, Pallavi travels to meet Karthik.

Back in the present, Pallavi tells Karthik that she is happily married to Arun and does not wish to go back with Karthik. Karthik objects saying she still loves him and is leading an unhappy life. Back in San Francisco, Pallavi tells Arun about her encounter and tells him they should call Karthik to their house for 10 days so he can see how happy they are. She contacts Karthik, who tells her that if he fails to see the love between her and Arun, she would have to go away with him. Pallavi, initially hesitant, agrees. Karthik lands in San Francisco, and immediately strikes an awkward relationship with Arun. He repetitively irks the couple and mocks their relationship, which annoys Pallavi. However, Arun's colleagues take a liking to Karthik, whose pessimistic nature offends a few other people. This is soon disrupted when Pallavi's father and his son-in-law, Omkar (Kaali Venkat), unexpectedly land in San Francisco. Karthik is introduced as Arun's old classmate and is made to promise Pallavi that he would not reveal his actual reason for being there. Pallavi's father reveals to Karthik that the daughter of his friend committed suicide after having been married off to a man she doesn't love instead of her lover. He had come to know on the wedding day that Pallavi had a lover from Nisha (Vidyullekha Raman), Pallavi's best friend. Doubting that Pallavi is unhappy with her marriage, he came to San Francisco to find her former lover so that he could get them married if she wanted. Karthik, realizing his advantage, indirectly begins to coax Pallavi's father and Omkar into finding the truth themselves. When Nisha is interrogated, she covers up with a fake story saying that the lover is married and Pallavi herself tells her father that she is happy. They all go for a trip to Santa Monica for Arun's business meeting. There Pallavi discovers that Arun is having an affair after seeing him hug another girl secretively in the parking lot. Pallavi's father too finds out about Karthik from a phone call with Arun's father and Nisha. Pallavi confronts Arun, who lies to her again, confirming to her his infidelity. She confides in Karthik, who believes she now hates Arun and wishes to be with him instead. However, when Pallavi's father tells Karthik that he wishes to get Pallavi married to Karthik a few days later, he tells Pallavi's father about his encounter with Arun. Having been an introvert since childhood, Arun's first friend was Caroline, who he met during his MBA. Her attitude towards him makes him feel he has found a best friend. She unexpectedly proposes to him one day, and he rejects her replying that he has never seen her in that way. He begins to avoid her and soon finds out she is now a drug addict and has attempted suicide. His guilt persuaded him to allow Pallavi to call Karthik, as he believed Karthik also was heading in Caroline's direction.

Karthik realizes that even though Pallavi can still be his, it is only right that she stays with Arun. He forces Pallavi's father and stages a play where he himself looks like a negative person to Pallavi and coaxes her into realizing Arun's honesty. Arun prepares to leave the house, believing Pallavi would be happy, but she does not allow him to do so, and they clear up their misunderstanding with Arun telling Pallavi that he loves only her. As they embrace at their reunion, Karthik is heartbroken and walks out of the house, crying and shattered.

Cast 
Atharvaa as Karthik 
Anupama Parameswaran as Pallavi (Voice dubbed by Chinmayi)
Amitash Pradhan as Arun 
Aadukalam Naren as Pallavi's father
Kaali Venkat as Omkar
Jagan as Karthik's friend
Vidyullekha Raman as Nisha, Pallavi's friend
R. S. Shivaji as Duraisamy, Karthik's professor
Stunt Silva as Bike Stealer

Production 
Atharvaa and Anupama Parameswaran were cast in the lead roles with Vaibhav speculated to also be a part of the cast. The media reports proved to be false and Amitash Pradhan was cast in the lead. Vidyullekha Raman reprises her role from the original film. The film was shot in Chennai, Russia, as well as Baku and Xızı in Azerbaijan. The cast and crew hiked up a mountain in Xızı for a five-minute shot in the film. The film is set in Lille, France.

Soundtrack 
Music of the film was composed by Gopi Sunder. Songs from the original Telugu version were retained and remade in Tamil. Kabilan Vairamuthu penned lyrics.
"Enna Thavam Seithen " -  Sathya Prakash, Saindhavi
"Idhaya Idhaya" - Sid Sriram
"Nee Varaindha Ooviyam" - Haricharan

Release
The film was scheduled to release on 3 December 2021, but was postponed. The film released on 24 December 2021.

Home media
The streaming rights was acquired by Amazon Prime Video. The film's satellite rights was acquired by Colors Tamil.

Reception

Critical response 
M.Suganth of The Times of India gave the film 2 out of 5 criticizing the writing, characterization, performances and emotional weight but praised the production settings but felt that "But this, in turn, only makes us feel like we are watching a feature-length TV commercial with hardly any emotional involvement."  Sify gave the film 3 on a scale of 5 and called the film 'Thalli Pogathey is yet another watchable Telugu remake!" Pinkvilla also gave the film 3 out of 5 praising the score, performances and cinematography and stated that the film is a "breezy entertainer that is worth a watch this weekend."

References

External links
 

2021 films
2021 comedy-drama films
2021 romantic comedy-drama films
2020s Tamil-language films
Films scored by Gopi Sundar
Films set in France
Films shot in France
Tamil remakes of Telugu films
Indian romantic comedy-drama films
Films directed by R. Kannan